Khalil El-Sayed (born 23 January 1965) is an Egyptian weightlifter. He competed in the men's middleweight event at the 1988 Summer Olympics.

References

1965 births
Living people
Egyptian male weightlifters
Olympic weightlifters of Egypt
Weightlifters at the 1988 Summer Olympics
Place of birth missing (living people)